Nielsen Pearson was an American duo consisting of Reed Nielsen and Mark Pearson. They are a one-hit wonder known for their only top 40 single, "If You Should Sail". Mark Pearson was also a member of The Brothers Four.

Discography

Albums
 The Nielsen Pearson Band (Epic, 1978)
 Nielsen/Pearson (Capitol, 1980)
 Blind Luck (Capitol, 1983)

Singles

References

External links
Nielsen Pearson Myspace

Nielsen Pearson Winterland Concert 1974

American soft rock music groups
Musical groups from Los Angeles
Rock music groups from California
American musical duos
Soft rock duos
Epic Records artists
Capitol Records artists